Murder of S Taher Ahmed refers to the murder of S Taher Ahmed, a professor of the University of Rajshahi.

History

Incident 
S Taher Ahmed was a professor of the Department of Geology and Mining at the University of Rajshahi. Ahmed was killed on 1 February 2006 and his body was recovered from a septic tank behind his house. After Mohammad Yunus, Ahmed was the second professor of University of Rajshahi to be killed by individuals with alleged links to Bangladesh Islami Chhatra Shibir. In August 2006, activists of Bangladesh Islami Chhatra Shibir threatened Professor Hasan Azizul Huq of the Philosophy Department of the university and accused him of being an atheist and anti-Islam.

On 10 February 2006, Jamaat-e-Islami Bangladesh held a rally with Mahbubul Alam Saleh and challenged members of the police to arrest him if they could. He was reported to have been involved in the murder.

Trial 

Rajshahi Metropolitan Police commissioner Naim Ahmed was instrumental in investigating the murder. He was praised by then opposition party Awami league Members of Parliament for his role in the investigation in the Jatiya Sangshad (parliament of Bangladesh). On 10 February 2006, during interrogation Dr Mia Mohammad Mohiuddin admitted his involvement with the murder. The trial in the case began on 18 June 2007 with six accused. On 3 February 2008, the students and faculty at University of Rajshahi called for a quick disposal of the case.

On 23 May 2008,  Judge ATM Mesbauddoula of the Speedy Trial Tribunal in Rajshahi gave four people the death sentence; they were Dr Mia Mohammad Mohiuddin, University of Rajshahi lecturer,  Jahangir Alam, caretaker of Ahmed residence, Abdus Salam, Jahangir's brother and an activist of Bangladesh Islami Chhatra Shibir, and Nazmul, Jahangir's brother-in-law. The court also acquitted two of the accused; Mahbubul Alam Salehi, President of University of Rajshahi unit of Bangladesh Islami Chhatra Shibir, and Azimuddin Munshi, Jahangir's father.  Convict Dr Mia Mohammad Mohiuddin is the brother-in-law of the former Minister of Post and Telecommunications, Aminul Haque.

Ahmed had discovered Mohiuddin was engaged in plagiarism and had prevented Mohiuddin's promotion.

Rajshahi unit President of Jamaat-e-Islami Bangladesh, Ataur Rahman, brought out a rally celebrating the verdict after members of his party's student wing were acquitted. Two former Vice-Chancellors of University of Rajshahi and teachers of the university expressed disappointment. Faculty of the University of Rajshahi and family members of Ahmed stated they felt unsafe after the release of Mahbubul Alam Saleh.

On 13 May 2013, Bangladesh High Court upheld the lower court verdict but reduced the sentences of Abdus Salam and Nazmul to life imprisonment. Family members filed an appeal with the higher court seeking punishment for Mahbubul Alam Saleh. On 2 February 2021, students and teachers at the university demanded quick finish of the trial.

See also 
 Murder of A. F. M. Rezaul Karim Siddique
 Mohammad Yunus (academic)
 Murder of A. K. M. Shafiul Islam

References 

2006 deaths
Academic staff of the University of Rajshahi
People murdered in Bangladesh
2006 murders in Bangladesh